Symbiote Investments Limited operating under the name Caricel is a Jamaican owned and operated mobile network.

History
Caricel was started in March 2014 when Symbiote applied for a Carrier and Service Provider licence from the Office of Utilities Regulation (OUR) in Jamaica. In February 2016, the Ministry of Science, Technology, Energy and Mining (MSTEM) announced that a new mobile network operator licence was being considered by the Jamaican Government. Despite a change in administration between the announcement and granting the licence in May, Caricel was approved for a Spectrum licence.

Technology
In 2016, Caricel announced it would roll out its LTE-only network within the Kingston Metropolitan Area. They invested over US$50 million in deployment and is looking at spending another US$50 million over the next 3 years. The company has already secured towers islandwide and said it would be rolling out to the rest of Jamaica.

References

External links
 

Mobile phone companies of the Caribbean
Companies based in Kingston, Jamaica
2014 establishments in Jamaica